St John the Baptist’s Church, Dronfield is a  Grade I listed parish church in the Church of England in Dronfield, Derbyshire.

History
The church dates from the late 13th century. It was altered in the mid 16th century, and had extensive repairs around 1819.

There were further alterations and restoration in 1855 by the architects Flockton and Son of Sheffield at a cost of £1,300. New roofs covered with lead were placed over the aisles. The nave roof was opened and the ceiling removed. New floors were laid and the seating was renewed. The west gallery was removed and the west window was partially filled with stained glass in memory of Mr Butterman of Dronfield. The Bishop of Lichfield reopened the church on Thursday 26 April 1855.

New stained glass was inserted in the east window in 1887 paid for by William Parker of Whittington Hall. F. R. Shields of London designed it and it was highly praised by Edward Burne-Jones.

Memorials
Thomas Godfred (d. 1399) and his brother Richard
John Fanshawe (d. 1580) and his wife Margaret
Sir Richard Barley

Churchyard
The churchyard contains war graves of two British Army soldiers of World War I.

Parish status
The church is in a joint parish with
St Andrew’s Church, Gosforth Valley
St Philip’s Church, Holmesdale
St Mary’s Church, Unstone
St Swithin’s Church, Holmesfield

Organ
The church contains an organ by Alexander Buckingham dating from 1830 that has been restored and extended several times. A specification of the organ can be found on the National Pipe Organ Register.

References

Church of England church buildings in Derbyshire
Grade I listed churches in Derbyshire
Dronfield